Museum of Local History may refer to:

United States
Museum of Local History - Fremont, California
Museum of Local History - Milton, Florida